Jacques Maillot (born 12 April 1962) is a French film director and screenwriter. He has directed nine films since 1993. His film Nos vies heureuses was entered into the 1999 Cannes Film Festival.

Filmography
 Des fleurs coupées (1993)
 Corps inflammables (1995)
 75 centilitres de prière (1995)
 Entre ciel et terre (1995)
 Our Happy Lives (1999)
 Froid comme l'été (2002)
 Rivals (2008)
 Un singe sur le dos (2009)
 La mer à boire (2012)
 Vivre sans eux (2018)

References

External links

1962 births
Living people
French film directors
French male screenwriters
French screenwriters
Film people from Besançon
Officers of the Order of Tahiti Nui